The Stratford Festival is a theatre festival which runs from April to October in the city of Stratford, Ontario, Canada. Founded by local journalist Tom Patterson in 1952, the festival was formerly known as the Stratford Shakespearean Festival, the Shakespeare Festival and the Stratford Shakespeare Festival. The festival was one of the first arts festivals in Canada and continues to be one of its most prominent. It is recognized worldwide for its productions of Shakespearean plays.

The festival's primary focus is to present productions of William Shakespeare's plays, but it has a range of theatre productions from Greek tragedy to Broadway musicals and contemporary works. In the early years of the festival, Shakespeare's works typically represented approximately one third of the offerings in the largest venue, the Festival Theatre. More recently, however, the festival's focus has shifted to encompass works by a more diverse range of playwrights.

The success of the festival changed Stratford into a city where arts and tourism play important roles in the economy. The festival attracts many tourists from outside Canada, most notably British and American visitors.

History

The Festival was founded as the Stratford Shakespearean Festival of Canada, by Tom Patterson, a Stratford-native journalist who wanted to revitalize his town's economy by creating a theatre festival dedicated to the works of William Shakespeare, as the town shares the name of Shakespeare's birthplace, Stratford-upon-Avon, England. Stratford was a railway junction and major locomotive shop, and was facing a disastrous loss of employment with the imminent elimination of steam power. Patterson achieved his goal after gaining encouragement from Mayor David Simpson and the local council, and the Stratford Shakespearean Festival became a legal entity on October 31, 1952.

Already established in Canadian theatre, Dora Mavor Moore helped put Patterson in touch with British actor and director Tyrone Guthrie, first with a transatlantic telephone call. On July 13, 1953, actor Alec Guinness spoke the first lines of the first play produced by the festival, a production of Richard III: "Now is the winter of our discontent / Made glorious summer by this son of York." Guinness and Irene Worth were among the cast of Stratford's inaugural performance of Richard III, working for expenses only.

This first performances (like the entire first four seasons) took place in a concrete amphitheatre covered by giant canvas tent on the banks of the River Avon. The first of many years of Stratford Shakespeare Festival production history started with a six-week season opening on 13 July 1953 with Richard III and then All's Well That Ends Well, both starring Alec Guinness. The 1954 season ran for nine weeks and included Sophocles’ Oedipus Rex and two Shakespeare plays, Measure for Measure and  The Taming of the Shrew. Young actors during the first four seasons included several who went on to great success in subsequent years, Douglas Campbell, Timothy Findley, Don Harron, William Hutt and Douglas Rain.

Fundraising to build a permanent theatre was slow but was helped significantly by donations from Governor General Vincent Massey and the Perth Mutual Insurance Company. The new Festival Theatre was dedicated on 30 June 1957, with seating for over 1,800 people; no seats are more than 65 feet from the stage. The design was deliberately intended to resemble a huge tent. That season's productions included Hamlet, Twelfth Night, the satirical My Fur Lady, The Turn of the Screw and Ibsen's Peer Gynt.

The Festival Theatre's thrust stage was designed by British designer Tanya Moiseiwitsch to resemble both a classic Greek amphitheatre and Shakespeare's Globe Theatre. It has since become a model for other stages in North America and Great Britain.

Tony Award-nominee Scott Wentworth has performed in the festival's stage productions on numerous occasions since 1985, beginning with The Glass Menagerie; the festival has helped Sara Topham launch her career in acting, performing from 2000 to 2011; and a young, unknown Christopher Walken appeared in Stratford's 1968 stage productions of Romeo and Juliet and A Midsummer Night's Dream, portraying Romeo and Lysander respectively.

Long-serving Artistic Director Richard Monette retired in 2007 after holding the position for fourteen seasons. He was replaced with an artistic team consisting of General Director Antoni Cimolino and Artistic Directors Marti Maraden, Des McAnuff, and Don Shipley. On March 12, 2008, it was announced that Shipley and Maraden would be stepping down, leaving Des McAnuff as sole Artistic Director. In 2013, Des McAnuff was replaced by Antoni Cimolino as Artistic Director.

In 2012, the Festival had a deficit of $3.4 million, but by 2015 had a surplus of $3.1 million under the control of Cimolino and executive director Anita Gaffney. The target of a half million ticket sales for the season (a previous record) had not yet been reached, but had achieved a significant increase in the number of new patrons to the theatres.

On 17 February 2015, AP News reported that the Stratford Shakespeare Festival plans to film all of Shakespeare's plays.

Actors who have participated in the festival include Alan Bates, Brian Bedford, Domini Blythe, Martha Burns, Jackie Burroughs, Zoe Caldwell, Douglas Campbell, Len Cariou, Brent Carver, Patricia Conolly, Susan Coyne, Jack Creley, Jonathan Crombie, Hume Cronyn, Henry Czerny, Cynthia Dale, Brian Dennehy, Colm Feore, Megan Follows, Maureen Forrester, Lorne Greene, Dawn Greenhalgh, Paul Gross, Alec Guinness, Amelia Hall, Uta Hagen, Julie Harris, Don Harron, Martha Henry, William Hutt, Frances Hyland, Charmion King, Andrea Martin, Barbara March, James Mason, Roberta Maxwell, Eric McCormack, Seana McKenna, Loreena McKennitt, Richard Monette, John Neville, Stephen Ouimette, Lucy Peacock, Nicholas Pennell, David J. Phillips, Amanda Plummer, Christopher Plummer, Sarah Polley, Douglas Rain, Kate Reid, Jason Robards, Alan Scarfe, Paul Scofield, Goldie Semple, William Shatner, Maggie Smith, Jessica Tandy, Peter Ustinov, Christopher Walken, Al Waxman, Irene Worth, Geraint Wyn Davies and Janet Wright.

Female directors at Stratford have included Pam Brighton, Zoe Caldwell, Marigold Charlseworth, Donna Feore, Jill Keiley, Pamela Hawthorne, Martha Henry, Jeannette Lambermont, Diana Leblanc, Marti Maraden, Weyni Mengesha, Carey Perloff, Lorraine Pintal, Vanessa Porteous, Susan H. Schulman, Djanet Sears, Kathryn Shaw, Jennifer Tarver.

From 1956 to 1961 and 1971 to 1976, the Stratford Festival also staged the separate Stratford Film Festival, which was credited as one of the first North American film festivals ever to schedule international films. That festival collapsed after the 1976 launch of the Festival of Festivals, now known as the Toronto International Film Festival, impacted both the Stratford Film Festival's funding and its audience.

In March 2020, as preparations for the upcoming season were underway, the Festival was forced to announce performance cancellations and layoffs due to the COVID-19 pandemic. A month later, the entire 2020 season was put on hold and effectively cancelled. Just before the season's cancellation, Cimolino announced that all productions that had been filmed as part of the Stratford Festival On Film series would be streamed online for free, with a different production being shown each week. Throughout the summer of 2020, the Festival produced four web series which, along with all the filmed productions and other Stratford documentaries and interviews, were launched in October 2020 on the new Stratfest@Home web streaming service.

In April 2021, the Festival announced a season of plays and cabarets, with most productions being held under large canopies at the Festival and Tom Patterson Theatres. Only one late-opening production was held indoors at the Studio Theatre with reduced capacity. The theme for the 2021 season was metamorphosis.

Today
The Festival traditionally runs from April to October, and has four permanent venues: the Festival Theatre, the Avon Theatre, the Tom Patterson Theatre, and the Studio Theatre. Although the Festival's primary mandate is to produce the works of Shakespeare, its season playbills include contemporary works and at least one musical, as well as the classic repertory. The Stratford Festival Forum runs during the season, and features music concerts, readings from major authors, lectures, and discussions with actors or management.

The Stratford Festival is an industry partner of the University of Waterloo Stratford Campus.

Directors

Artistic Directors

Tyrone Guthrie (1953–1955)
Michael Langham (1956–1967)
Jean Gascon (1968–1974)
Robin Phillips (1975–1980)
John Hirsch (1981–1985)
John Neville (1985–1989)
David William (1990–1993)
Richard Monette (1994–2007)
Marti Maraden, Des McAnuff, Don Shipley (2007–2008)
Des McAnuff (2008–2012)
Antoni Cimolino (2013–)

Executive Directors/General Managers

Victor Polley
William Wylie
Bruce Swerdfager—General Manager (1972–1976)
 Gary Thomas
Mary Hofstetter—General Manager (1995–1997)
Antoni Cimolino—Executive Director (1998–2006); General Director (2007–2012)
Anita Gaffney—Executive Director (2013–)

Productions

2022 season
Hamlet – by William Shakespeare
Chicago – music by John Kander, lyrics by Fred Ebb, and book by Ebb and Bob Fosse
The Miser – by Molière, translated by Ranjit Bolt
Richard III – by William Shakespeare
All's Well That Ends Well – by William Shakespeare
Death and the King's Horseman – by Wole Soyinka
Little Women – by Louisa May Alcott, adapted by Jordi Mand
Every Little Nookie – by Sunny Drake
Hamlet–911 – by Ann-Marie MacDonald
1939 – by Jani Lauzon and Kaitlyn Riordan

2023 season (announced) 

The 2023 season programmed by Artistic Director Antoni Cimolino has a theme of Duty vs. Desire.

King Lear – by William Shakespeare
Rent –  music, lyrics, and book by Jonathan Larson
Much Ado About Nothing – by William Shakespeare
Les Belles Soeurs – by Michel Tremblay
Monty Python's Spamalot – book and lyrics by Eric Idle, music by John Du Prez and Eric Idle
A Wrinkle in Time – by Madeleine L'Engle, adapted by Thomas Morgan Jones
Frankenstien Revived – by Morris Panych, music by David Coulter
Richard II – by William Shakespeare
Grand Magic – by Eduardo De Filippo, translation by John Murrell
Wedding Band – by Alice Childress
Casey and Diana – by Nick Green
Women of the Fur Trade – by Frances Koncan
Love’s Labour’s Lost – by William Shakespeare

See also 

 Theatre in Canada
 Mary Jolliffe, the festival's first publicist
 James Alexander Cowan, one of the founders of the festival
 The Stratford Adventure, a 1954 National Film Board documentary on the founding of the festival, with Tyrone Guthrie and Alec Guinness
 Slings and Arrows, a 2003–2006 Canadian television comedy set in a fictional Shakespearean company modelled after Stratford

References

Further reading

External links

 The Stratford Festival official website
 Finding aid to the Raphael Bernstein Collection, 1956-2002, at Columbia University. Rare Book & Manuscript Library.
 Stratford Festival fonds (R9812) at Library and Archives Canada. Fonds consists of history interviews about the Festival between 1970 and 1982.

Theatre festivals in Ontario
Theatre companies in Ontario
Shakespearean theatre companies
Barton Myers buildings
Tourist attractions in Perth County, Ontario
Festivals established in 1953
1953 establishments in Ontario
Shakespeare festivals in Canada
Festivals in Stratford, Ontario